Lucius Vitellius (before 7 BC – AD 51) was the youngest of four sons of procurator Publius Vitellius and the only one who did not die through politics. He was consul three times, which was unusual during the Roman empire for someone who was not a member of the Imperial family. The first time was in the year 34 as the colleague of Paullus Fabius Persicus; the second was in 43 as the colleague of the emperor Claudius; the third was in 47 again as the colleague of the emperor Claudius.

Career
Under Emperor Tiberius, he was consul and in the following year governor of Syria in 35. He deposed Pontius Pilate in 36 after complaints from the people in Samaria. He supported Emperor Caligula, and was a favorite of Emperor Claudius' wife Valeria Messalina. During Claudius' reign, he was Consul again twice, and governed Rome while the Emperor was absent on his invasion of Britain. Around the time that Claudius married Agrippina the Younger in 47, 48 or 49, Vitellius served as a Censor. Josephus, in his Antiquities of the Jews, records that he wrote Tiberius to request that the Jewish high priestly robe be allowed back under Jewish control and this request was granted.

He wielded great influence and was known for his outstanding character, though, at one time, a Senator accused him of treason. He died of paralysis in 51. Lucius received a state funeral and had a statue on the rostra bearing the inscription ‘steadfast loyal to the Emperor’.

Family
Lucius married Sextilia, a reputable woman from a distinguished family, who gave birth to two sons, Aulus Vitellius Germanicus (the ephemeral Emperor in 69), and Lucius Vitellius.

In fiction 
Vitellius is a prominent character in Robert Graves's novel Claudius the God as an intimate friend of Claudius.

References

External links
 Lucius Vitellius entry in historical sourcebook by Mahlon H. Smith
 Livius.org: Lucius Vitellius

1st-century BC births
51 deaths
Year of birth uncertain
1st-century Roman governors of Syria
Ancient Roman equites
Lucius
1st-century Romans
Imperial Roman consuls
Roman censors
Roman governors of Syria